This is a list of Mexican writers.
Isabel Fraire  Guggenheim Fellowship; Xavier Villaurrutia Award; 
Celso Aguirre Bernal
José Agustín   Guggenheim Fellowship;
Carmen Alardín  Xavier Villaurrutia Award; 
Elizabeth Algrávez  poet  
Claudia Amengual  Sor Juana Inés de la Cruz Prize;
Araceli Ardón  Rosario Castellanos Prize;
Alejandro Ariceaga
Homero Aridjis  Neustadt Prize Candidate; Xavier Villaurrutia Award; Guggenheim Fellowship;Roger Caillois Prize; Grinzane Cavour Prize; Smederevo Golden Key; 
Juan José Arreola  Juan Rulfo Prize; National Prize; Xavier Villaurrutia Award; Alfonso Reyes Prize 
Francisco Azuela Order of the Liberator of Central-America 
Mario Bellatin  Xavier Villaurrutia Award; Guggenheim Fellowship  
Rubén Bonifaz Nuño   Alfonso Reyes Prize; Guggenheim Fellowship;
Carmen Boullosa  Xavier Villaurrutia Award; Guggenheim Fellowship  
Coral Bracho   Xavier Villaurrutia Award; Guggenheim Fellowship; 
Federico Campbell  Guggenheim Fellowship; 
Marco Antonio Campos  Xavier Villaurrutia Award; 
Julieta Campos  Xavier Villaurrutia Award; 
Gabriel Careaga Medina  sociologist
Rosario Castellanos Xavier Villaurrutia Award  
Ali Chumacero  National Prize; Xavier Villaurrutia Award; Alfonso Reyes Prize; 
Ana Clavel  Juan Rulfo Prize; Elena Poniatowska Ibero-American Novel Prize
Bárbara Colio, playwright and theater director, Maria Teresa Leon International Prize
Rosina Conde  Gilberto Owen Award  
Amparo Dávila  Xavier Villaurrutia Award; 
Guadalupe Dueñas José María Vigil Award; 
Ernesto de la Peña  Xavier Villaurrutia Award; 
Fernando del Paso  Romulo Gallegos Prize; Xavier Villaurrutia Award; Guggenheim Fellowship; 
Salvador Elizondo  Xavier Villaurrutia Award; Guggenheim Fellowship;
Malva Flores  Aguascalientes Prize; 
Carlos Fuentes      Cervantes Prize; Prince of Asturias Award; Romulo Gallegos Prize; Xavier Villaurrutia Award; Alfonso Reyes Prize; Neustadt Prize Candidate; Menendez y Pelayo Prize
Sergio Galindo  Xavier Villaurrutia Award; 
Juan García Ponce  Juan Rulfo Prize; Xavier Villaurrutia Award; Guggenheim Fellowship 
Emilio García Riera  Xavier Villaurrutia Award; 
Jesús Gardea   Xavier Villaurrutia Award; 
Ángel María Garibay National Prize;
Elena Garro  Sor Juana Inés de la Cruz Prize; Xavier Villaurrutia Award; 
Margo Glantz  National Prize; Sor Juana Inés de la Cruz Prize; Xavier Villaurrutia Award; Guggenheim Fellowship; 
Enrique González Rojo Xavier Villaurrutia Award; 
Hugo Gutiérrez Vega  Xavier Villaurrutia Award; 
Martín Luis Guzmán  National Prize;
Andrés Henestrosa  Alfonso Reyes Prize; 
Deborah Holtz  journalist 
David Huerta   Xavier Villaurrutia Award; 
Vicente Leñero  National Prize; Xavier Villaurrutia Award; Guggenheim Fellowship 
Rossy Evelin Lima  Gabriela Mistral Award; 
Eduardo Lizalde  Xavier Villaurrutia Award; Guggenheim Fellowship 
Luis Felipe Lomeli   San Luis Potosi Prize; 
Pura López Colomé Alfonso Reyes National Essay Award, National Poetry Translation Prize, Xavier Villaurrutia Prize
Ramón López Velarde, no prizes known
Gregorio Lopez y Fuentes National Prize;
María Luisa Puga  Xavier Villaurrutia Award; 
José Manuel Prieto  Guggenheim Fellowship;
Carlos Martin Briceño
José Luis Martínez  Alfonso Reyes Prize; Menendez y Pelayo Prize; 
Ángeles Mastretta   Romulo Gallegos Prize; 
Ernesto Mejía Sánchez  Alfonso Reyes Prize; 
Ernesto Mejía Sánchez Xavier Villaurrutia Award;
Eugenio Méndez Docurro
Silvia Molina  Sor Juana Inés de la Cruz Prize; Xavier Villaurrutia Award  
Carlos Monsiváis  Juan Rulfo Prize; National Prize; Xavier Villaurrutia Award 
Carlos Montemayor  Xavier Villaurrutia Award  
Marco Antonio Montes de Oca Xavier Villaurrutia Award; Guggenheim Fellowship;
Myriam Moscona  Guggenheim Fellowship; Xavier Villaurrutia Award 
Angelina Muñiz-Huberman Sor Juana Inés de la Cruz Prize;
Guadalupe Nettel Herralde Prize; 
Rosa Nissán Ariel León Dultzin Award
José Emilio Pacheco Octavio Paz Prize; Xavier Villaurrutia Award; Garcia Lorca Prize; Alfonso Reyes Prize;
Ignacio Padilla  Guggenheim Fellowship; 
Octavio Paz         Nobel Prize; Cervantes Prize; Neustadt Prize; National Prize; Alfonso Reyes Prize; Jerusalem Prize; Menendez y Pelayo Prize; Doctor Honoris Causa (Harvard); Xavier Villaurrutia Award
Carlos Pellicer Cámara National Prize 
Sergio Pitol Cervantes Prize; National Prize; Herralde Prize; Juan Rulfo Prize; Guggenheim Fellowship; Xavier Villaurrutia Award
Elena Poniatowska  National Prize; Xavier Villaurrutia Award; Romulo Gallegos Prize; Guggenheim Fellowship; 
Félix Ramos y Duarte  (1848–1924), Cuban-born educator, textbook writer, lexicographer, compiled the first dictionary of Mexican Spanish 
Roberto Ransom  (born 1960), Irish Mexican novelist and short story writer  
José Revueltas  Xavier Villaurrutia Award; 
Alfonso Reyes  National Prize;
Vicente Riva Palacio
Margarita Peña
Cristina Rivera Garza Sor Juana Inés de la Cruz Prize;
Max Rojas  Carlos Pellicer Iberoamerican Prize in Poetry
Alejandro Rossi    Xavier Villaurrutia Award; Guggenheim Fellowship; 
Juan Rulfo  National Prize; Prince of Asturias Award; Xavier Villaurrutia Award; 
Alberto Ruy Sánchez  Xavier Villaurrutia Award; Guggenheim Fellowship;
Rafael Saavedra
Jaime Sabines  National Prize; Xavier Villaurrutia Award; 
Daniel Sada  Xavier Villaurrutia Award;
Gustavo Sainz  Xavier Villaurrutia Award;
Adolfo Sánchez Vázquez National Prize 2002
Guillermo Schmidhuber de la Mora Dramaturgo y crítico, author de cuarenta obra de teatro y cien libros
Tomás Segovia  Juan Rulfo Prize; Octavio Paz Prize; Xavier Villaurrutia Award; 
Esther Seligson  Xavier Villaurrutia Award; 
Ignacio Solares  Xavier Villaurrutia Award; Guggenheim Fellowship;
Martín Solares Efraín Huerta National Literary Award (1998) 
Reies Tijerina 
Jaime Torres Bodet  National Prize;
Julio Torri
Xavier Velasco Alfaguara International Prize
Josefina Vicens  Xavier Villaurrutia Award; 
Maruxa Vilalta, National Prize 2010
Juan Villoro  Herralde Prize; Xavier Villaurrutia Award 
Jorge Volpi  Guggenheim Fellowship; 
Ramón Xirau   Alfonso Reyes Prize; Guggenheim Fellowship;
Gabriel Zaid  Xavier Villaurrutia Award; 
Luis Zapata
Eraclio Zepeda  Xavier Villaurrutia Award;

See also 
 Mexican literature
 List of Mexican women writers
 List of Latin American writers

References

External links
Mexico: A Traveler's Literary Companion, preface, table of contents, excerpts, and interview with editor C.M. Mayo 

Mexican
Writers
 List